The 1930 Women's Western Open was a golf competition held at Acacia Country Club, which was the 1st edition of the event. Lucia Mida won the championship in match play competition by defeating June Beebe in the final match, 6 and 5.

Women's Western Open
Golf in Illinois
Women's Western Open
Women's Western Open
Women's Western Open
Women's sports in Illinois